Zone 5  may refer to:

Travelcard Zone 5, of the Transport for London zonal system
Hardiness zone, a geographically defined zone in which a specific category of plant life is capable of growing
Zone 5 of Milan